The 1987 Eastern Michigan Hurons football team represented Eastern Michigan University during the 1987 NCAA Division I-A football season. Eastern Michigan competed as a member of the Mid-American Conference (MAC), was coached by Jim Harkema, and played their homes game at Rynearson Stadium. They finished the season 10–2 overall and 7–1 in MAC play while winning the MAC championship. It was their first conference team since joining the MAC and first overall since winning the Illinois Intercollegiate Athletic Conference in 1957. The Hurons went to the 1987 California Bowl (their first bowl appearance since joining Division I and first since the 1971 Pioneer Bowl) and upset 17 point favorite San Jose State for their first bowl win in EMU history. It is the first and so far only time Eastern Michigan has had a ten win season along with their last bowl appearance until 2016.

Schedule

Coaching staff

References

Eastern Michigan
Eastern Michigan Eagles football seasons
Mid-American Conference football champion seasons
Eastern Michigan Hurons football